Richard Owen describes the mandible of the broad-billed parrot.
Philip Sclater Exotic Ornithology (1866–69). 
Carl Jakob Sundevall Conspectus avium picinarum, Stockholm [Sweden] :Samson & Wallin, 1866.[on woodpeckers] online BHL
Birds described in 1866 include Cabanis's tanager, bar-winged rail, spot-crowned antvireo, Van Dam's vanga, Mayotte drongo,
Death of Johann Wilhelm von Müller 
Death of Philipp Franz von Siebold
Axel Wilhelm Eriksson leaves Sweden for South-West Africa. 
Foundation of Museu Paraense Emílio Goeldi.
Death of Christian Ludwig Landbeck. He had described many bird species in collaboration with Rodolfo Amando Philippi.
Death of Ferdinand Joseph L'Herminier
Philippi, R. A. & Landbeck, L. 1866. Beiträge zur Fauna Chiles. Archiv für Naturgeschichte 32: 121–132.Masafuera rayadito
Expeditions
1865–1868 Magenta circumnavigation of the globe  Italian expedition that made important scientific observations in South America. 
Ongoing events
John Gould The birds of Australia; Supplement 1851–69. 1 vol. 81 plates; Artists: J. Gould and H. C. Richter; Lithographer: H. C. Richter
John Gould The birds of Asia; 1850-83 7 vols. 530 plates, Artists: J. Gould, H. C. Richter, W. Hart and J. Wolf; Lithographers:H. C. Richter and W. Hart
The Ibis

References

Bird
Birding and ornithology by year